Matzor (translit. Siege) is a 1969 Israeli film directed by Italian director Gilberto Tofano. It involves the theme of a widowed mother (actress Gila Almagor), her lover (actor Dahn Ben Amotz) and ex-husband friend (actor Yehoram Gaon). It was entered into the 1969 Cannes Film Festival. The film was also selected as the Israeli entry for the Best Foreign Language Film at the 42nd Academy Awards, but was not accepted as a nominee.

Cast
 Eran Agmon
 Gila Almagor as Tamar
 Yael Aviv
 Dahn Ben Amotz
 Yehoram Gaon as Eli
 Omna Goldstein
 Anni Grian
 Micha Kagan
 Raviv Oren
 Amir Orion
 Baruch Sadeh
 Uri Sharoni

See also
 List of submissions to the 42nd Academy Awards for Best Foreign Language Film
 List of Israeli submissions for the Academy Award for Best Foreign Language Film

References

External links 
 
Matzor page on The New York Times

1969 films
1960s Hebrew-language films
1969 drama films
Israeli black-and-white films
Films about the Israel Defense Forces
Israeli drama films